2000 World Ice Hockey Championships may refer to:
 2000 Men's Ice Hockey World Championships
 2000 IIHF Women's World Championship
 2000 IIHF World U18 Championships